Čeláre is a village and municipality in the Veľký Krtíš District of the Banská Bystrica Region of southern Slovakia.

History
The village was first mentioned in 1436 (Chalard). It belonged to many feudal families, and Feudal Law was always strictly applied here. From 1554 to 1593 it was occupied by Turks. Until 1918 and from 1938 to 1944 it belonged to Hungary.

Genealogical resources

The records for genealogical research are available at the state archive "Statny Archiv in Banska Bystrica, Slovakia"

 Lutheran church records (births/marriages/deaths): 1745-1931 (parish B)

See also
 List of municipalities and towns in Slovakia

External links
http://www.statistics.sk/mosmis/eng/run.html
http://www.e-obce.sk/obec/celare/celare.html
Surnames of living people in Celare

Villages and municipalities in Veľký Krtíš District